Walter Fernando Guglielmone Gómez (born 11 April 1978) is a Uruguayan former professional footballer who played as a forward. During his career, Guglielmone has played for clubs in Uruguay, France, Azerbaijan, Mexico, Paraguay and China. He made two appearances for the Uruguay national team in 2001.

Club career
Guglielmone began his career in Uruguay, making his debut for Nacional de Montevideo in 1999.  After a year with them, he moved to Frontera Rivera, followed the next year by another move to Montevideo Wanderers. Guglielmone left Uruguay to join AC Ajaccio in the French Ligue 1 for the 2002–03 season, appearing 17 times and scoring just once, in the game against Sedan on 24 August 2002. However, after just a year in France, he returned to Uruguay, where he played for Danubio during the first half of 2004. He joined Pachuca for the 2004 Apertura, finishing the season with three goals in 11 games played, 6 starts.

In 2007, Guglielmone joined Azerbaijan Premier League side Inter Baku, becoming the first Latin American to play for the club. Guglielmone spent two season with Inter and was the top goalscorer during the 2008–09 season. For his third season in Azerbaijan, Guglielmone moved to Baku rivals, Neftchi Baku. After leaving Neftchi Baku in the summer of 2010, he joined Club Guaraní of the Paraguayan Primera División in July 2010.

In July 2011, after one season back at Wanderers, Guglielmone was released. Five months late, on 21 December 2011, Guglielmone joined Brazilian side Pelotas. On 31 March 2012, Guglielmone received a red card for shoving teammate Douglas Silva twice in the face in a Campeonato Gaúcho match against Caxias. After leaving Pelotas, Guglielmone signed with Beijing BIT in the Chinese Jia League.

International career
Guglielmone appeared twice for the Uruguay national team, with his debut coming on 19 July 2001 against Honduras in the  2001 Copa América. His second appearance came 9 days later in the Third-place match also against Honduras.

Personal life
He is the older half-brother of Valencia CF striker Edinson Cavani.

Career statistics

Club

International

Honours

Club
Nacional
Uruguayan Primera División: 2002

Danubio
Uruguayan Primera División: 2004

Inter Baku
Azerbaijan Premier League: 2007–08

Individual
Azerbaijan Premier League Top Scorer: 2008–09 (17 goals)

Notes

External links

References

1978 births
Living people
Uruguayan footballers
Uruguayan expatriate footballers
Uruguay international footballers
Club Nacional de Football players
Peñarol players
Danubio F.C. players
C.F. Pachuca players
Club Guaraní players
Liverpool F.C. (Montevideo) players
Montevideo Wanderers F.C. players
Shamakhi FK players
AC Ajaccio players
Neftçi PFK players
Uruguayan Primera División players
Liga MX players
Ligue 1 players
Azerbaijan Premier League players
China League One players
Paraguayan Primera División players
2001 Copa América players
Footballers from Salto, Uruguay
Expatriate footballers in Paraguay
Expatriate footballers in Mexico
Expatriate footballers in France
Expatriate footballers in Brazil
Expatriate footballers in China
Expatriate footballers in Azerbaijan
Uruguayan sportspeople of Italian descent
Uruguayan expatriate sportspeople in Paraguay
Uruguayan expatriate sportspeople in Mexico
Uruguayan expatriate sportspeople in France
Uruguayan expatriate sportspeople in Brazil
Uruguayan expatriate sportspeople in China
Uruguayan expatriate sportspeople in Azerbaijan
Association football forwards